The Pakistan cricket team toured England in the 1982 season and played a three-match Test series against England between 29 July and 31 August 1982. England won the series 2–1. After this, England did not win another Test series against Pakistan for 18 years.

Test series summary

First Test

Second Test

Third Test

One Day Internationals (ODIs)

England won the Prudential Trophy 2-0.

1st ODI

2nd ODI

Annual reviews
 Playfair Cricket Annual 1983
 Wisden Cricketers' Almanack 1983

References

1982 in English cricket
1982
International cricket competitions from 1980–81 to 1985